Thomas Stanley Farrell (born 23 September 1932) is a British hurdler. He competed in the men's 400 metres hurdles at the 1956 Summer Olympics. He represented England in the 440 yards hurdles at the 1958 British Empire and Commonwealth Games in Cardiff, Wales.

References

1932 births
Living people
Athletes (track and field) at the 1956 Summer Olympics
Athletes (track and field) at the 1960 Summer Olympics
British male hurdlers
British male middle-distance runners
Olympic athletes of Great Britain
Place of birth missing (living people)
Athletes (track and field) at the 1958 British Empire and Commonwealth Games
Commonwealth Games competitors for England